Phyllonotus margaritensis, common name the Margarita Murex, is a species of sea snail, a marine gastropod mollusk in the family Muricidae, the murex snails or rock snails.

Description
Shell presents large and strong reaching sizes between 7–11 cm, with 4 or 5 lap varices, varices these are simple, nodular and obtuse, siphonal canal wide and curved. The mouth has colors that can vary from yellow, orange and red and the inner lip is nodulated at the base.

Sexual dimorphism
Studies in relation to the size of males and females suggests that females tend to have Phyllonotus margaritensis size larger than males and greater variation in shape.

Distribution
North Carolina to Florida and Caribbean sea to Brazil. In the Southern Caribbean is noted in: Colombia, Venezuela and Trinidad.

Habitat
This sea snail is often found in abundance in seagrass beds, but also can be observed on rocky areas and reef areas at lower densities. It has been collected in a bathymetric range from 0 to 200 m. This muricid is an active predator of bivalves such as sand-dwelling clams.

Gallery

References

Reading
 Merle D., Garrigues B. & Pointier J.-P. (2011) Fossil and Recent Muricidae of the world. Part Muricinae. Hackenheim: Conchbooks. 648 pp. page(s): 116

External links
 Zipcodezoo.com: Phyllonotus margaritensis 
 
 Biodiversity Heritage Library: Bibliography for Phyllonotus margaritensis
 Smithsonian Nationañ Museum of Natural History
 Sea life base: Phyllonotus margaritensis (Abbott, 1958)

Muricidae
Gastropods described in 1958
Taxa named by Robert Tucker Abbott